The Ardblair Stones are a strength and endurance competition, and the nine reinforced concrete lifting stones used for the competition. The goal of the competition is to lift each stone sequentially from smallest to largest and place them on top of whiskey barrels as quickly as possible. The stones are named for Ardblair Castle located in Blairgowrie, Perthshire in Scotland, close to where they originated.

The stones were created by Charlie Blair Oliphant in 2008, based on World's Strongest Man competitions he had seen on TV as a child. Oliphant wanted to create an event that was accessible to all people, regardless of age and ability, and would be free to all. The stones made their debut in September 2012 at the Highland Games. Based on the success and interest of the event, the stones have since toured the United Kingdom.

References

External links 
 Official site

Stones
Strongmen competitions
Scottish games